Turbanellidae is a family of worms belonging to the order Macrodasyida.

Genera:
 Desmodasys Clausen, 1965 
 Dinodasys Remane, 1927 
 Marinellina Ruttner-Kolisko, 1955 
 Paraturbanella Remane, 1927 
 Prostobucantia Evans & Hummon, 1991 
 Prostobuccantia Evans & Hummon, 1991 
 Pseudoturbanella d'Hondt, 1968 
 Turbanella Schultze, 1853

References

Gastrotricha